Bilgola Creek is an urban gully or open channel that is located in the northern beaches region of Sydney, New South Wales, Australia.

Course and features

A smaller ephemeral creek line also flows down from the escarpment at the northern end of Bilgola Beach.

See also 

 Rivers of New South Wales

References 

Creeks and canals of Sydney